The Jaramillo Petrified Forest National Park is a protected area of petrified forest located in the Deseado Department, in the northeast of Santa Cruz Province, Argentina. This area has remnants of a forest preserved in stone, that had been growing on the site before the upthrust of the Andes some 150 million years ago.

The site
The park is in the Patagonian steppe ecoregion where the climate is cool and dry in summer, and cold and fairly dry in winter, with less than  precipitation and strong westerly winds. The fossilised trees were first discovered in 1925 and have been the subject of much research since.

History

About 150 million years ago, during the late Jurassic period, the area occupied by this national park had a stable climate with abundant moisture. Dense forests with giant trees grew here, among which were Araucaria mirabilis, an ancient relative of modern species of Araucaria, a kind of evergreen conifer.

This changed at the start of the Cretaceous period, when volcanic eruptions, which coincided with the start of upthrusting of the Andes mountains, buried some of the Patagonian territory in ash and lava. Part of the forests covered by ash were subjected to the processes of petrification. This process requires the fallen tree to be in an oxygen-free environment which preserves the original plant structure and general appearance, but which periodically gets inundated by mineral-rich water, replacing the organic structure with silica and other minerals. The end result is petrified wood.

The site is of particular interest because it shows that the climate of this part of Patagonia was much wetter before the Andes intercepted the humid airflow from the west.

Climate

The climate of the park is characterized as being cold, arid, and windy with large temperature swings between day and night. The park receives  of rainfall per year, which is mostly concentrated in the summer months. Snowfall can occur during winter.

Flora and fauna
The vegetation in the park is mostly low spiny shrubs adapted for living in arid environments; these include Caesalpinia gilliesii, Berberis microphylla, Arthrophyllum rigidum, Chiliotrichum diffusum, Mulinum spinosum and Fragaria chiloensis. The flightless lesser rhea is known from the park and mammals present include the guanaco, the dwarf armadillo, the culpeo fox and the South American gray fox.

References

Protected areas of Santa Cruz Province, Argentina
National parks of Argentina
Petrified forests